Tephritis triangula is a species of tephritid or fruit flies in the genus Tephritis of the family Tephritidae.

Distribution
Japan.

References

Tephritinae
Insects described in 1952
Diptera of Asia